Juca Chaves (born 22 October 1938 in Rio de Janeiro, as Jurandyr Czaczkes) is a Brazilian comedian, singer and writer well known for his irreverence.  He is the son of Austrian Jewish immigrants.

Biography 
With a background in classical music, he began composing in his childhood. He began his career in the late 1950s, playing modinhas and trovas in a soft style. In the 60's, he set up a circus near the Rodrigo de Freitas Lagoon, the Cantagalo Court . There he presented his show "Menestrel Maldito."

Chaves was an active critic of the Brazilian military regime, of the mainstream press, and of the recording industry itself. He became an exile in Portugal in the early 1970s, during the presidency of Emílio Garrastazu Médici, but when his satires of the fascist regime then in power began to gain popularity on television and radio, he felt compelled to move to Italy.

Upon returning to Brazil, he became a television presenter. In the 1980s, he established an independent record label, Sdruws Records.

In 2006, Chaves launched his candidacy for senator in Bahia as a member of the Christian Social Democratic Party, ending in 4th place, with 19,603 votes (0.35% of the total). His campaign advertisements, released in the form of poems, distinguished him from the other candidates. In addition, he ran for federal deputy in 2010, also unsuccessfully.

Chaves lives in Bahia with wife Yara Chaves (m. 1975), with whom he has two adoptive daughters, Maria Morena and Maria Clara. Among his musical successes are: “Por Que Sonha Ana Maria?”, “Pequena Marcha Para Um Grande Amor”, “Aquarela dos Sonhos”, “Meu Violão Morreu”, “Auto Retrato”, “Caixinha, Obrigado”, “Presidente Bossa Nona”, “Dona Maria Teresa”, “Que Saudade,” and “Take me Back to Piauí.”
He is also known for being a fan of São Paulo Futebol Clube.

Discography 

1950s
1957 Nós Os Gatos / Chapéu de Palha com Peninha Preta (78 RPM Chantecler)
1957 Por Quem Sonha Ana Maria? / Nasal Sensual (78 RPM)
1957 Presidente Bossa Nova / Menina (78 RPM Chantecler)

1960s
1960 As Duas Faces de Juca Chaves (LP  RGE)
1961 A Personalidade Juca Chaves  (LP  RGE)
1962 As Músicas Proibidas de Juca Chaves (LP  Odeon)
1963 O Senhor Juca Chaves (Modinhas) (LP  Odeon)
1965 Exmo Sig Juca Chaves-Italiano (LP  Fonit-Cetra)
1966 Il Vostro Affmo.Juca-Italiano (LP  Fonit-Cetra)
1966 Per Chi Sogna Ana Maria / Ó Naso Mio (45 RPM Fonit-Cetra)
1966 Pavana Per La Contessa Alessandra (45 RPM Fonit-Cetra)

1970s
1970 Take Me Back To Piauí / Vou Viver Num Arco Íris (33 RPM RGE/Sdruws)
1972 I Love You Bicho  (LP  RGE)
1974 Ninguém Segura Este Nariz  (LP  Polygran)
1977 Juca Bom De Câmara  (LP  Som Livre/Sdruws)
1979 O Pequeno Notável  (LP  Warner/Sdruws)

1980s
1980 Marchinha do São Paulo (LP  Continental)
1983 O Incrível Juca Chaves "Ao vivo ou Morto" (LP  Sdruws/ Editora Rocco)
 1985 O Menestrel do Brasil-Enfim (Quase)Livre (LP  Sdruws)
1989 Sentir-se Jovem (LP - Sdruws/BMG)

2000s
2000 Protesto da Criança Inteligente / Humor e Música (CD  Sdruws)
2001 O Menestrel do Brasil / Sátira/Humor/Modinhas (CD  Sdruws)

References

External links 
 Facebook

Musicians from Rio de Janeiro (city)
1938 births
Living people
Brazilian Jews
Jewish male comedians
Brazilian comedians
Brazilian people of Austrian descent